Hedley on the Hill is a village in Northumberland, west of Newcastle upon Tyne. It is located between the valley of the River Derwent, and the watershed to the River Tyne.

Despite being close to a major city, Hedley is typically Northumbrian and rural in character. Situated close to the villages of Stocksfield and Chopwell as well as to the rural market town of Hexham it is a small village with views across the Tyne valley.

History
Hedley appears to have escaped rather unscathed in the wars between England and Scotland that occurred before the union. There are no records of any battles in the area. Similarly, there is no record of any activity involving border reivers (tribal leaders and outlaws that fought across the Scottish/English border) in the village. This has enabled it to develop in relative isolation, with mining and quarrying being the prominent industries since the eighteenth century.

Hedley on the Hill is also close to Hadrian's Wall a World Heritage Site and located in the far south of "Hadrian's Wall Country".

The village is said to have once been home to a bogle known as The Hedley Kow.

Culture
The village holds numerous events including the annual barrel race in which contestants, usually in pairs, run up the hill to the pub with a barrel of beer. The barrel race is run every bank holiday Monday, and organised by The Feathers Inn. Competitors carry an empty nine-gallon beer barrel, over a 1.5-mile course. The Feathers Inn in Hedley-on-the-Hill was named the Great British Pub of the Year 2011.

It is also popular with gliding enthusiasts, being the closest village to the Northumbria Gliding Club in Leadgate.

Governance 

Hedley is in the parliamentary constituency of Hexham.

References

External links

 Brief summary of the village, from the official page of "Hadrian's Wall Country"
 Cumberland News | Easter offers a barrel of laughs
 Northumbria Gliding Club

Villages in Northumberland